Steven Ira "Steve" Wulf (born December 4, 1950) is an American magazine journalist, editor, and book writer.  A former executive editor at ESPN The Magazine, Wulf continues to write for ESPN The Magazine as well as ESPN.com.  Before joining ESPN, Wulf worked for numerous publications, including The Evening Sun in Norwich, NY, Sports Illustrated, Entertainment Weekly, The Economist, and Time. While working at SI as an associate writer, he met his wife, Jane Bachman Wulf, who was the magazine's chief of reporters.

Early life and education
Wulf was born in New York City, New York, and raised in Troy, New York.

He attended high school at The Albany Academy, in Albany, New York; and graduated from Hamilton College, in Clinton, NY, with a degree in English. After graduating from Hamilton, Wulf climbed into his '69 Chevy Malibu and visited every newspaper in the Northeast until he found a job.

Career
Wulf found his first job at The Evening Sun, a local newspaper in Norwich, NY. As Wulf once recalled in a story he wrote for Sports Illustrated, he spent "15 months as a—no—the sportswriter for The Evening Sun." In one particularly humorous moment during the slow summer months, Wulf once quoted himself in the recap of a local softball game. After a 29-5 victory, Wulf was the only player to go hitless and, having no choice but to interview the player, he "quoted" him as saying, "I went through a two-game batting slump in one night. But I think that I, more than anyone, was responsible for keeping the score down."

After leaving Norwich, Wulf migrated south and worked for the Fort Lauderdale News as its horse-racing writer. He later did free-lance work for newspapers in Boston before becoming a fact-checker at Sports Illustrated. He worked his way up to becoming a staff writer, and then later moved to Time Magazine. When ESPN decided to start its own magazine, Wulf left Time to become one of ESPN The Magazine's original editors.

Books 
In addition to his forty years of newspaper and magazine writing, Wulf has published various books including:

 0:01: Parting Shots from the World of Sports
 Baseball Anecdotes
 I Was Right On Time
 Legends of the Field
 The Mighty Book Of Sports

Film and television 
Wulf consulted in the making of the documentary television series Baseball, directed by Ken Burns, and has appeared on numerous episodes of ESPN SportsCentury as well as ESPN's 30 for 30 series.

Michael Jordan article 
In March 1994, Wulf wrote an article about Michael Jordan's minor-league-baseball career, which was featured on the cover with the headline "Bag It Michael". Due to the incendiary headline, Jordan cut off official communication with Sports Illustrated and his silence continues to this day.

30 for 30 
Wulf also appeared numerous times in 30 for 30, a documentary series on ESPN television. He was interviewed for Silly Little Game, a documentary about the genesis of rotisserie league baseball, as well as Jordan Rides the Bus. In Jordan, Wulf recounts his controversial Sports Illustrated article about Michael's attempt to play baseball. He admits to being too critical of Jordan, but also reveals that he visited the legendary basketball player a second time and wrote a story about how he was showing signs of major-league potential. Sports Illustrated did not run the second story.

Personal 
Wulf has been married since October, 1984. He and his wife Jane have two sons, Bo and John, as well as twin daughters, Eve and Elizabeth. Wulf often writes about his children and boasts on his Twitter page that he is "the father of four pitchers."

See also
 List of Hamilton College people
 List of people from New York City
 List of sports writers

References

External links 
 Datebase (undated).  "Previous Steve Wulf Columns".  ESPN The Magazine.  Retrieved August 5, 2012.
 
 

1950 births
20th-century American writers
21st-century American non-fiction writers
American magazine editors
Journalists from New York City
Living people
Sportspeople from Troy, New York
Hamilton College (New York) alumni
Sportspeople from New York City
Sportswriters from New York (state)
Writers from New York City
Sports Illustrated
ESPN people
The Albany Academy alumni